Loma, or Lomakka (also Lomasse, or—ambiguously—Malinke), is a Gur language of Ivory Coast.

References

Kulango languages
Languages of Ivory Coast